Khuda Ki Basti is a Pakistani Urdu novel penned by Shaukat Siddiqui in 1957. The novel is about life in a Karachi slum built after the independence of Pakistan in 1947 and about the struggles in the lives of poor people living there. Khuda Ki Basti TV Drama Serials were made in 1969 and 1974 based on the novel.

Description 
A modern classic of Urdu literature by Shaukat Siddiqui, Khuda Ki Basti (God's Own Land), takes place during the 1950s in the slums of Karachi and Lahore in a newly independent Pakistan. The story revolves around a poor, respectable family which has fallen on hard times. Corruption and degradation take over their lives. Jobless, and without any real hope of a better life, they find themselves in the clutches of unprincipled evil people who exploit them. It's the story of a young woman, Sultana, and her younger brother Annu. Their widowed mother is first pursued by a conniving man from the neighbourhood who apparently wants to marry her. But whose real intentions are to get access to her pretty young daughter, Sultana, for his sexual pleasure? After this man marries the mother, he arranges a medically facilitated murder of her. Then the vulnerable children are exploited in every way by the neighbourhood's shady characters. The tragic, deeply moving finale is inevitable.

Adaptations
Khuda Ki Basti was adapted as a serial produced by Pakistan Television in 1969 and 1974. In 1974, Prime Minister Zulfikar Ali Bhutto asked for the re-telecast of Khuda Ki Basti as it was Bhutto’s favorite TV serial for its appealing social message. But Pakistan Television had problems with it as the videotape recordings of Khuda Ki Basti on spool videotape in 1969 had long been erased due to video tape scarcity back then and re-recording of other programs on the same videotape. Zulfikar Ali Bhutto insisted that the serial must be re-telecast even if fresh recording is essential. 

The 1974 version of re-recorded Khuda Ki Basti was 50-minute episodes that lasted 13 weeks and created the same social impact that the 1969 version did. TV directors Bakhtiyar Ahmed and Qasim Jalali did a fine job. After the 1974 version was filmed,  the entire TV serial has been well maintained by Pakistan Television with a repeat telecast in 1990.
This novel was also dramatized by Rashid Sami (Kohinoor Studio). This was released on Geo TV.

See also 
 Khuda Ki Basti, a neighborhood of Karachi

References

External links
Book Review of Khuda Ki Basti (novel) on goodreads.com website

Urdu-language fiction
Pakistani novels
Urdu-language literature
Novels by Shaukat Siddiqui
1957 novels
Urdu-language novels
Novels set in Karachi